Alfredo Arévalo Reyes (born February 20, 1976) is a Guatemalan marathon runner. In 2004, he achieved both his personal best and a national record-breaking time of 2:12:53 at the National Capital Marathon in Ottawa, Ontario, Canada.

Arevalo made his official debut for the 2004 Summer Olympics in Athens, where he finished seventy-seventh in the men's marathon, outside his personal best of 2:34:02.

At the 2008 Summer Olympics in Beijing, Arevalo competed again for the second time in men's marathon, along with his compatriot José Amado García. He finished the race in sixty-third place by twelve seconds behind Montenegro's Goran Stojiljković, with a time of 2:28:26.

Personal bests
5000 m: 14:30.07 min –  Ciudad de Guatemala, 18 February 2006
10,000 m: 29:21.43 min –  Stanford, California, 1 May 2010
Half marathon: 1:06:42 hrs –  San Pedro Sula, 19 June 2004
Marathon: 2:12:53 hrs –  Ottawa, 30 May 2004

Achievements

References

External links

NBC Olympics Profile

Guatemalan male marathon runners
Living people
Olympic athletes of Guatemala
Athletes (track and field) at the 2004 Summer Olympics
Athletes (track and field) at the 2008 Summer Olympics
Pan American Games competitors for Guatemala
Athletes (track and field) at the 2003 Pan American Games
Athletes (track and field) at the 2007 Pan American Games
Athletes (track and field) at the 2011 Pan American Games
Competitors at the 2002 Central American and Caribbean Games
Competitors at the 2006 Central American and Caribbean Games
Competitors at the 2010 Central American and Caribbean Games
Central American and Caribbean Games bronze medalists for Guatemala
1976 births
Central American Games bronze medalists for Guatemala
Central American Games medalists in athletics
Central American and Caribbean Games medalists in athletics
20th-century Guatemalan people
21st-century Guatemalan people